Larry “LD” Rowden (born March 17, 1949) is a former American football linebacker. He played for the Chicago Bears from 1971 to 1972.

References

1949 births
Living people
American football linebackers
Houston Cougars football players
Chicago Bears players